Lingxiu is a town of Shishi City, in the south of Fujian province, China.

See also
List of township-level divisions of Fujian

References

Township-level divisions of Fujian